Before I'm Over You is a studio album by American country singer-songwriter Loretta Lynn. It was released on June 22, 1964 via Decca Records and was produced by Owen Bradley. It was Lynn's second studio album issued in her recording career and contained a total of 12 tracks. Two songs from the record were released as a singles and became major hits on the Billboard country chart: the title track and "Wine, Women and Song." The album received positive reception from music publications after its release.

Background and content
Before I'm Over You was Lynn's second studio album and second with the Decca label. Lynn had previously recorded and released singles for the Zero label, which brought her first major hit in 1960. With the assistance of The Wilburn Brothers, Lynn signed with Decca Records in 1961 and released her first album with the label in 1963. Sessions for her second album took place between 1962 and 1964 at two separate studios in Nashville, Tennessee: the Bradley Studio and the Columbia Studio. All of the sessions were produced by Owen Bradley.

The album consisted of 12 tracks. One of these tracks were self-composed by Lynn herself ("Where Were You") and another was composed by her husband ("This Haunted House.") The latter song was written about the death of Patsy Cline, who was Lynn's good friend and mentor. Additional songs on the album were written by other songwriters and some had also been recorded previously. This included "Loose Talk," which was first a major country hit for Carl Smith. Also featured is a cover of Bob Wills's "My Shoes Keep Walking Back to You" and Brenda Lee's "Fool No. 1." Lynn had originally recorded the demonstration tape of "Fool No. 1" before even being signed to Decca Records. Lynn's version was heard by producer Owen Bradley, who signed her to the record label shortly after receiving the demo recording. Lynn re-recorded the song for Decca for this release.

Release and reception

Before I'm Over You was released on June 22, 1964 via Decca Records and was Lynn's second studio album released in her career. It was issued as a vinyl LP, containing six songs on each side of the record. Before I'm Over You became Lynn's second album release to also reach the Billboard Top Country Albums chart, peaking at number 11 in 1964.

The album also included two singles that were previously released and became major hits. The first single to become a hit was the title track, which was released in October 1963. The song became Lynn's second top ten hit, reaching number four on the Billboard Hot Country Singles chart in 1964. "Wine, Women and Song" was released as the next single in April 1964, which reached number three on the Billboard country chart. Before I'm Over You received positive reviews upon its release. Billboard magazine gave it a favorable review in June 1964. "Loretta Lynn is a fine country artist. She sings with genuine feeling and honesty of approach," they wrote. In later years, the album received three out of five stars in a rating conducted by Allmusic.

Track listing

Personnel
All credits are adapted from the liner notes of Before I'm Over You.

Musical personnel
 Harold Bradley – electric guitar
 Cecil Brower – fiddle
 Floyd Cramer – piano
 Buddy Harman – drums
 Don Helms – steel guitar
 Tommy Jackson – fiddle
 The Jordanaires – background vocals
 Jerry Kennedy – guitar
 Loretta Lynn – lead vocals
 Grady Martin – electric guitar
 Bob Moore – bass
 Jack Pruett – electric guitar
 Teddy Wilburn – guitar

Technical personnel
 Owen Bradley – producer
 Hal Buksbaum – photography
 Johnny Mullins – liner notes

Chart performance

Release history

References 

1964 albums
Albums produced by Owen Bradley
Decca Records albums
Loretta Lynn albums